Rainmaking is a weather modification ritual that attempts to invoke rain.

Among the best known examples of weather modification rituals are North American rain dances, historically performed by many Native American tribes, particularly in the Southwestern United States. Some of these weather modification rituals are still implemented today.

Examples

North America

Julia M. Buttree (the wife of Ernest Thompson Seton) describes the rain dance of the Zuni, along with other Native American dances, in her book The Rhythm of the Redman. Feathers and turquoise, or other blue items, are worn during the ceremony to symbolize wind and rain respectively. Details on how best to perform the Rain Dance have been passed down by oral tradition. In an early sort of meteorology, Native Americans in the midwestern parts of the modern United States often tracked and followed known weather patterns while offering to perform a rain dance for settlers in return for trade items. This is best documented among the Osage and Quapaw Indian tribes of Missouri and Arkansas.

In April 2011, Texas governor Rick Perry called the Days of Prayer for Rain in the State of Texas, asking that Texans pray for "the healing of our land [Texas]" and for an end to the drought.

In the Ozarks, multiple methods of attempting to call rain have been documented:Other hillmen try to produce rain by burning brush along the creeks, or hanging dead snakes belly-up on fences, or killing frogs and leaving them in the dry road, or putting salt on gravel bars, or suspending live turtles above the water. [..] In some localities people imagine that they can cause a rain by submerging a cat in sulphur water—they don’t drown the animal, but make sure that it is completely under water for a moment at least. I once saw this tried at Noel, Missouri, but without any success.

Africa
Rain is a central concern of African societies which depend on it for their sustenance and that of their animals. The power to make rain is usually attributed to African kings. In a number of African societies, kings who failed to produce the expected rain ran the risk of being blamed as scapegoats and killed by their people. A famous rain making monarch is the Rain Queen of Balobedu, South Africa.

Tribal rain dances are done to ensure rain comes. Notable peoples known to have done rain dances are tribes on the Sahara Desert and Ethiopia.

North Africa

China
Wu Shamans in ancient China performed sacrificial rain dance ceremonies in times of drought. Wu anciently served as intermediaries with nature spirits believed to control rainfall and flooding.
"Shamans had to carry out an exhausting dance within a ring of fire until, sweating profusely, the falling drops of perspirations produced the desired rain."

Europe
Festus distinguishes it from another , "stone of the Manes") brought from its usual resting place, the Temple of Mars in Clivo near the Porta Capena, into the Senate. Offerings were made to Jupiter petitioning for rain, and water was ceremonially poured over the stone.

Caloian, Dodola and Perperuna, among other terms, refer to a family of Slavic and Romanian rainmaking rituals, some of which survived into the 20th century.

See also 
Green Corn Ceremony

References

External links

 Dragon Festival for rainmaking in Nio, Japan  NHK (video)
 The Long Strange Journey of Earth's Traveling Microbes (2011). Fred Pearce. Yale Environment 360.

 
Native American dances
Native American religion
Ritual dances